Cricket at the 2019 Pacific Games was held between 8–13 July 2019 at the Faleata Oval Grounds in Apia, Samoa. A men's and women's Twenty20 event took place, with matches eligible to carry Twenty20 International status if both teams were members of the ICC and meet player eligibility criteria. Papua New Guinea won the gold medal in the men's after defeating Vanuatu by 32 runs in the final, but were beaten in the final of the women's event by Samoa.

Medal summary

Medal table

Results

Participating teams

Women:
 
 
 
 

Men:

Standings

Men

Women

See also
 Cricket at the Pacific Games

References

 
2019 Pacific Games
Pacific Games
2019
International cricket competitions in Samoa
21st century in Apia